Milcho Angelov (born 2 January 1995) is a Bulgarian footballer who plays as a forward for Romanian Liga II side FC Brașov.

Career
Born in Irechekovo, Yambol Province, Angelov joined the Chernomorets Burgas youth team in 2009.

He made his senior debut on 23 November 2012, at the age of 17, scoring two goals in a 5–0 victory over Spartak Pleven in the Bulgarian Cup. On 16 January 2013, Angelov signed his first professional contract. On 10 March 2013, he made his A PFG debut, starting in a game against CSKA Sofia.

Statistics

Honours
Slavia Sofia
 Bulgarian Cup (1): 2017–18

References

External links

1995 births
Living people
Bulgarian footballers
Bulgaria youth international footballers
First Professional Football League (Bulgaria) players
PFC Chernomorets Burgas players
PFC Litex Lovech players
PFC CSKA Sofia players
PFC Slavia Sofia players
SFC Etar Veliko Tarnovo players
FC Tsarsko Selo Sofia players
Liga II players
FC Brașov (2021) players
Association football forwards
People from Yambol Province
Bulgarian expatriate footballers
Bulgarian expatriate sportspeople in Romania
Expatriate footballers in Romania